Cost of living is the cost of maintaining a certain standard of living. Changes in the cost of living over time can be operationalized in a cost-of-living index. Cost of living calculations are also used to compare the cost of maintaining a certain standard of living in different geographic areas.  Differences in cost of living between locations can be measured in terms of purchasing power parity rates.

Definition

Cost of living is the cost of maintaining a certain standard of living. Changes in the cost of living over time can be operationalized in a cost-of-living index. Cost of living calculations can be used to compare the cost of maintaining a certain standard of living in different geographic areas.  Differences in cost of living between locations can be measured in terms of purchasing power parity rates.

Cost-of-living adjustment (COLA)

Employment contracts and pension benefits can be tied to a cost-of-living index, typically to the consumer price index (CPI). A COLA adjusts salaries based on changes in a cost-of-living index. Salaries are typically adjusted annually. They may also be tied to a cost-of-living index that varies by geographic location if the employee moves. In this later case, the expatriate employee will likely see only the discretionary income part of their salary indexed by a differential CPI between the new and old employment locations, leaving the non-discretionary part of the salary (e.g., mortgage payments, insurance, car payments) unmodified.

Annual escalation clauses in employment contracts can specify retroactive or future percentage increases in worker pay which are not tied to any index. These negotiated increases in pay are colloquially referred to as cost-of-living adjustments or cost-of-living increases because of their similarity to increases tied to externally determined indexes. Cost-of-living allowance is equal to the nominal interest minus the real interest rate.

Consumer Price Index (CPI) 

When cost-of-living adjustments, negotiated wage settlements and budgetary increases exceed CPI, media reports frequently compare the two without consideration of the pertinent tax code. However, CPI is based on the retail pricing of a basket of goods and services. Most purchases of that same basket require the use of after-tax dollars—dollars that were often subject to the highest marginal tax rate. Consequently, the COLA will necessarily have to exceed the CPI inflation rate to maintain purchasing power.

The widely recognized problem known as bracket creep can also occur in countries where the marginal tax brackets themselves are not indexed — COLA increases simply place more dollars into higher tax rate brackets. Only under a flat tax system would a percentage gain on gross income translate into a comparable inflation-offsetting gain at the after-tax level.

Some salaries and pensions in the United States with a COLA include:
 Social Security
 Civil Service Retirement System (CSRS)
 Federal Employees Retirement System (FERS)

Pensions in Canada with a COLA include:
 Canadian Auto Workers union (CAW) Local 200 (Ontario)

Social security benefits

United States
Social security benefits in the United States receive cost-of-living adjustments (COLAs) to match increases in the Consumer Price Index for Urban Wage Earners and Clerical Workers (CPI-W). They can also receive funds from public charities for specific issues. The COLAs are made at most annually and are calculated based on the value of the CPI-W in the third quarter of the year (averaging the values from July, August, and September). COLAs can only increase benefits, so in deflationary years when the CPI-W drops there is no COLA.

Worldwide survey
The Economist Intelligence Unit produces a semi-annual (twice yearly) worldwide cost of living survey that compares more than 400 individual prices across 160 products and services. They include food, drink, clothing, household supplies and personal care items, home rents, transport, utility bills, private schools, domestic help and recreational costs.

The survey itself is an internet tool designed to calculate cost-of-living allowances and build compensation packages for corporate executives maintaining a western lifestyle. The survey incorporates easy-to-understand comparative cost of living indices between cities. The survey allows city-to-city comparisons, but for the purpose of this report all cities are compared to a base city of New York City, which has an index set at 100. The survey has been carried out for more than 30 years.

The most recent survey was published in March 2017. Singapore remains the most expensive city in the world for the fourth year running, in a rare occurrence where the entire top five most expensive cities were unchanged from the year prior. Sydney and Melbourne have both cemented their positions as top-ten staples, with Sydney becoming the fifth most expensive, and Melbourne becoming the sixth. Asia is home to more than five most expensive cities in the top twenty but also home to eight cheapest cities of the cheapest ten.

Other uses 

Stipends or extra pay provided to employees who are being temporarily relocated may also be called cost-of-living adjustments or cost-of-living allowances. Such adjustments are intended to offset changes in welfare due to geographic differences in the cost of living. Such adjustments might more accurately be described as a per diem allowance or tied to a specific item, as with housing allowances. Employees who are being permanently relocated are less likely to receive such allowances, but may receive a base salary adjustment to reflect local market conditions.

A non-taxable cost-of-living allowance is frequently given to members of the U.S. military stationed at overseas bases if the area to which a service member is assigned has a higher cost of living than the average area in the United States. For example, service members stationed in Japan receive a cost of living allowance of between $300 and $700 per month (depending on pay grade, years of service, and number of dependents), in addition to their base pay.

See also
 Living wage
ACCRA Cost of Living Index
Cost of living in Namibia
Eardex.com
United Kingdom cost of living crisis
 United States Consumer Price Index
 Consumer Price Index
 Inflation
 Price index
 Cost of Living Allowance (U.S. Military)
 List of U.S. states by adjusted per capita personal income
Specific:
 List of most expensive cities for expatriate employees
 Middle class squeeze
 Cost of raising a child
 Walk to work protest

References

External links

 Economist Intelligence Unit worldwide cost of living survey results (requires registration)
 Cost-of-Living Calculator relative to time from American Institute for Economic Research (AIER)
 Expatistan a crowd sourced comparison site
 Cost Off Living a global living cost comparison site

Personal finance